Abell 3742 is a galaxy cluster located around 200 million light-years (61 Mpc) from Earth in the constellation Indus. The cluster's brightest member is the elliptical galaxy NGC 7014. Abell 3742 is located in the Pavo–Indus Supercluster and is one of three major clusters along with Abell 3656 and Abell 3698.

See also
 Abell catalogue
 List of Abell clusters
 Galaxy cluster

References 

 
Indus (constellation)
Galaxy clusters
Pavo-Indus Supercluster
3742
Abell richness class 0